Arthur Jerome Gob (November 7, 1937 - May 8. 2017) was a National Football League (NFL) defensive end for the Washington Redskins and in the American Football League (AFL) for the Los Angeles Chargers. He played college football at the University of Pittsburgh and was drafted in the 22nd round of the 1959 NFL Draft. He died on May 8, 2017, at the age of 79.

References 

1937 births
2017 deaths
American football wide receivers
Los Angeles Chargers players
Pittsburgh Panthers football players
Players of American football from Pittsburgh
Washington Redskins players